The UD Croner  is a line of medium-duty commercial vehicles produced by UD Trucks with Volvo Group and sold outside of Japan.
In India, this model is sold under Pro 3010 series name by VE Commercial Vehicles Limited's brand Eicher Trucks and Buses. Available in semi high deck,low deck and high deck

History
In 2017, it started selling in Ecuador and South Africa. It won the 2017 Good Design Award.

Models
LKE : 12t - 14t
MKE : 10.4t - 11t
PKE : 15t - 17t

See also
UD Condor
UD Kuzer
UD Quester
UD SLF

References

External links

official
Croner LKE
Croner MKE
Croner PKE

Croner
Cab over vehicles